Cyclostrema placens is a species of sea snail, a marine gastropod mollusk in the family Liotiidae.

References

External links
 To World Register of Marine Species

placens
Gastropods described in 1901